The 2006 Queensland Cup season was the 11th season of Queensland's top-level statewide rugby league competition run by the Queensland Rugby League. The competition, known as the Queensland Wizard Cup due to sponsorship from Wizard Home Loans featured 11 teams playing a 26-week long season (including finals) from March to September.

The Redcliffe Dolphins won their fifth premiership, defeating the Toowoomba Clydesdales 27–6 at Suncorp Stadium. Souths Logan Magpies  Brandon Costin was named the competition's Player of the Year, winning the Courier Mail Medal.

Teams 
In 2006, the Queensland Cup retained the same 11 teams that competed in the 2005 season. The Wynnum Seagulls, who played under that name from 1995 to 2005, returned to playing as the Wynnum Manly Seagulls.

Ladder

Finals series

Grand Final 

Toowoomba finished the regular season as minor premiers and charged into the Grand Final after a dominant 56–22 win over Redcliffe in the major semi final. Redcliffe ended the season in 3rd place and upset the 2nd place North Queensland Young Guns 22–8 in the first week of the finals. After the big loss to Toowoomba, the Dolphins defeated Easts 30–16 to qualify for their eighth Grand Final and their fourth against the Clydesdales. In the regular season, Toowoomba defeated Redcliffe 42–28 in Round 8, while the Dolphins won the return match 34–16 in Round 18.

First half 
Toowoomba prop Ben Vaeau opened the scoring in just the 3rd minute of the contest when he steamrolled through the Dolphins defence from 10 metres out to score. Redcliffe hit back in the 8th minute when halfback Marty Turner stepped through some soft defence to score under the posts. With 10 seconds remaining in what was a tough first half, the Dolphins took the lead when fullback Ryan Cullen went through under the posts to score. The Dolphins taking a 12–6 lead into the half time break.

Second half 
Redcliffe maintained their narrow six-point lead for most of the second half, before hooker Mick Roberts kicked a field goal in the 67th minute to extended his side's lead to seven. Just over a minute later the Dolphins had their third try of the game when centre Nick Emmett batted down a Roberts' cross-field kick to his winger Rory Bromley who scored in the corner. Redcliffe pulled off a carbon copy of the try five minutes later when Emmett brought down a Turner kick and handed it off to Bromley who got his second. With two minutes remaining, Mark Shipway scored to seal the contest for Redcliffe and secure their fifth Queensland Cup premiership.

The 2006 Grand Final would be the last game the Toowoomba Clydesdales would ever play in the Queensland Cup. One of the foundation clubs of the competition, the Clydesdales ceased operations at the end of the year due to financial reasons.

End-of-season awards 
 Courier Mail Medal (Best and Fairest): Brandon Costin ( Souths Logan Magpies)
 Coach of the Year: Anthony Griffin ( Redcliffe Dolphins)
 Rookie of the Year: David Tyrrell ( Easts Tigers)
 Representative Player of the Year: Mick Roberts ( Queensland Residents,  Redcliffe Dolphins)

See also 

 Queensland Cup
 Queensland Rugby League

References 

2006 in Australian rugby league
Queensland Cup